Danilo's student (Serbian: Данилов ученик; 14th century) was an anonymous Serbian medieval writer. Researchers were unable to find out either his worldly nor monastic name. All that is known that at the court of Archbishop Danilo II he was "fed, loved and taught".

Life 
He belonged to a small circle of associates of Stefan Dušan, who after the death of Danilo II, Serbian Archbishop in 1337, the logothete (chancellor) was appointed as archbishop and thus tried to put the Serbian church under his stronger influence.

Literary work 
Danilo's student wrote three biographies: his mentor "Danilo," "The Life of the King Stefan Dečanski and "The Life of King Dušan the Mighty" only until the time of the collection "Lives of Kings and Archbishops" (1337—1340) and Žitije archiepiscopal Danilo II, Serbian Archbishop.

It is assumed that from the biographies compiled by Archbishop Danilo and from his own, which he wrote according to the same pattern between 1337 and 1340, he made a whole, the collection "Lives of Serbian Kings and Archbishops" (the so-called "Danilo's Collection"). ). His narration is chronic, focused on external events (eg the description of the defence of Hilandar; the description of the battle of Velbužde), which goes beyond the old poetics of presenting internal spiritual values and linguistic and stylistic ups and downs.

Translation into modern Serbian
  Danilo's followers. Danilo's student, other followers of Danilo's collection. Edited by Gordon Mak Danijel, today's language version Lazar Mirković, Belgrade, Prosveta, SKZ, 1989, Stara srpska književnost u 24 knjige, knj. 7.

Literature 
 С. Novaković: "Narodna tradicija i kritička istorija", Otađbina 1880, knj. - {V} -, no. 17;
 И. Pavlović:  Literary works of Archbishop Danilo - {II} - , Belgrade 1888:
 L J. Stojanović: "Lives of Serbian Kings and Archbishops and by Archbishop Danilo and Others" Glas SA, 1923, - {CVI} -;
 Text by George Sp. Radojičić in:  Enciklopedija Jugoslavije , Zagreb, JLZ, 1984, volume - {III} -, p. 383.
 Н. Radojčić: "On Archbishop Danilo - {II} - and his successors" (foreword translated by L. Mirković: The Life of Serbian Kings and Archbishops). Belgrade 1935, p. - {V — XXIX} -;
 М. Kašanin: "Danilo's Continuator, Serbian Literature in the Middle Ages", Belgrade 1975, p. 234—252;
 Dimitrije Bogdanović: "History of Old Serbian Literature", Belgrade, SKZ, 1980.

References 

14th-century Serbian writers